ORP Mazur was a torpedo boat, then gunnery training ship of the Polish Navy. She was the former German torpedo boat V-105. She took part in the Polish Defensive War and was sunk by German bombers on September 1, 1939, as the first combat ship lost in the war.

History
She was built in 1914 by Stettiner Maschinenbau A.G. Vulcan in Stettin, Germany (now in Poland). She was begun for a Dutch Navy order, as Z-1 (along with three sister ships Z-2 – Z-4), but after the outbreak of World War I she was confiscated by Germany and commissioned as torpedo boat V-105. During a division of the German ships after the war in December 1919, Poland was assigned only six torpedo boats, due to a reluctance of the British to strengthen newborn navies. V-105 was first assigned to Brazil, but then bought by a British dockyard and finally in 1921 exchanged with Poland for another torpedo boat (A-69), needed for spares, for extra charge £900 from the Poles. Poland also received her sister ship, V-108 as well (later the Polish ), and four smaller torpedo boats. V-105 was in a bad condition and after some repairs in Rosyth, in September 1921 she was towed from Great Britain to Free City of Danzig, now Gdańsk.

Polish service 
After a refit, she was commissioned in the Polish Navy on August 2, 1922, under the name ORP Mazur (named after the Mazurian people). She served in a torpedo boat unit (Dywizjon Torpedowców) and wore identification letters MR. In 1931 she was rebuilt as a gunnery training ship, and her armament changed. From 1935 she underwent a modernization, during which the ship lost a second funnel, returning to service in 1937.

Demise 
On the first day of World War II, September 1, 1939, ORP Mazur, commanded by Lieutenant Tadeusz Rutkowski, was in a port of Oksywie. At 2 pm she was at a pier, preparing to leave port, when she was attacked by German Junkers Ju 87s from  IV./LG.1. The ship suffered one close hit and a hit amidships, and sunk still firing at the German aircraft. A crew member, although the ship was sinking, kept firing until waves washed him overboard, which was First Lieutenant Jacek Dehnel, the grandfather of the Polish poet and writer Jacek Dehnel. About 40 of the crew were killed. She was one of the first two ships sunk during the war, the other was an auxiliary ship (divers' tender) ORP Nurek. The wreck was scrapped by the Germans.

Gallery

References

Bibliography

See also 
 SMS V106
 SMS V107

Ships built in Stettin
World War I torpedo boats of Germany
World War II naval ships of Poland
Torpedo boats of the Polish Navy
World War II shipwrecks in the Baltic Sea
1914 ships
Maritime incidents in September 1939
Ships sunk by German aircraft
Torpedo boats of the Imperial German Navy
Shipwrecks of Poland